Sue Whitebrook (born 2 February 1960) is an Australian sprint canoeist who competed in the mid-1970s. She was ultimately eliminated in the repechages of K-2 500 m event the 1976 Summer Olympics in Montreal.

References
Sports-reference.com profile

1960 births
Australian female canoeists
Canoeists at the 1976 Summer Olympics
Living people
Olympic canoeists of Australia